The 2011 World Thoroughbred Rankings was an assessment of Thoroughbred racehorses issued by the International Federation of Horseracing Authorities (IFHA) in January 2011. It included horses aged three or older which competed in flat races during 2011. It was open to all horses irrespective of where they raced or were trained.

Rankings for 2011
 For a detailed guide to this table, see below.

Guide
A complete guide to the main table above.

References

World Thoroughbred Racehorse Rankings
World Thoroughbred Rankings 2011